Alberto Octavio Tserclaes de Tilly (also known as Antonio; 1646 – 10 September 1715) was a Spanish general of Wallon origins, the grandson of a brother of General Johann Tserclaes Count of Tilly, who acquired fame in the Thirty Years War.

Biography
In 1693, he was granted the title of prince by King Charles II of Spain. He took part in the Spanish War of Succession (1701–1714) on the side of the young French-born Prince, later King Philip V of Spain against his opponent Charles VI of Austria of the Habsburgs. He fought in the Portuguese campaign during 1704, during which he advanced along the left bank of the river Tagus, conquering Portalegre and consolidating the Alentejo region, while the young Philip and James FitzJames, 1st Duke of Berwick advanced along the right bank of the river.

In 1705, there was a conspiracy in which Diego Dávila Mesía y Guzmán, Captain General of Catalonia, sided with Charles of Austria. Alberto Octavio warned the central authorities. For this assistance, Philip V of Spain bestowed upon him in 1706 the title of Grandee of Spain, a title which included the privilege of remaining covered or seated in the presence of royalty.

Antonio Octavio served as Viceroy of Navarre in 1706–1709 and as Captain General of Aragon in 1711–1714.

In 1714, he was appointed Captain General of Catalonia, replacing FitzJames. He died in Barcelona the following year.

References
El primer capitán general de Cataluña, marqués de Castelrodrigo (1715-1721) y el control del austracismo by  Enrique Giménez López, in Los Borbones : dinastía y memoria de nación en la España del siglo XVIII : (Actas del coloquio internacional celebrado en Madrid, mayo de 2000), 2002, pags. 401-422

External links
https://web.archive.org/web/20090328151227/http://www.ejercito.mde.es/organizacion/mrpir/historia.html
http://www.ejercito.mde.es/Unidades/es/unidades/Barcelona/ige/Historia/dep
http://www.mcu.es/archivos/CE/ExpoVisitVirtual/visitas/aragon/fondos/contenido.html
https://web.archive.org/web/20180707172934/http://www.spanishsuccession.nl/armies/spanish_netherlands_cavalry.html

1646 births
1715 deaths
Grandees of Spain
Spanish generals
Spanish people of Dutch descent
Spanish people of Flemish descent
Spanish army commanders in the War of the Spanish Succession
Viceroys of Navarre
T'Serclaes
Knights of the Golden Fleece of Spain